Cromie is a surname. Notable people with the surname include:

 Bob Cromie (1881–1962), Australian rules footballer
 Francis Cromie (1882–1918), British Royal Navy Commander
 Karen Cromie (1979–2011), Northern Irish rower, wheelchair basketball player and Paralympian
 Sir Michael Cromie, 1st Baronet (c. 1744–1824), Anglo-Irish politician
 Robert Cromie (1855–1907), Northern Irish journalist and novelist
 Robert James Cromie (1887–1936), Canadian newspaper publisher

See also
 Cromie baronets
 Cromie McCandless (1921–1992), Northern Irish Grand Prix motorcycle road racer
 Mount Cromie, in Antarctica